Dobara is a Pakistani television series produced by Momina Duraid under banner MD Productions, directed by Danish Nawaz and written by Sarwat Nazir. It first aired on 20 October 2021 on Hum TV. It features Hadiqa Kiani as Mehrunisa who gets a chance to change her life after the death of her dominating husband Hidayatullah. It also features Bilal Abbas Khan, Usama Khan, Nabeel Zuberi and Sabeena Syed in pivotal roles.

Synopsis
On the occasion of death of her husband Hidayatullah in his early seventies, Mehrunissa feels as a free spirit and recalls the bitter memories of her past when her dying father decided to marry her off at 16 years of age to Hidayatullah, who was 36 at the time. At the time of the funeral notices the strange behaviour of Mehrunissa who is not emotionally affected by her husband's death. On the other hand, Mahir is a next-door care free boy who is a tennis player and in search of a job.

Cast 
 Hadiqa Kiani as Mehrunnisa "Mehru"
 Prerna Bajaj as Mehru (young)
 Bilal Abbas Khan as Maahir, Mehrunnisa's second husband
 Usama Khan as Affan, Mehrunnisa's son
 Maheen Siddiqui as Minal, Mehrunnisa's daughter
 Sabeena Syed as Sehar, Affan's wife
 Nabeel Zuberi as Zameer, Minal's husband
 Zoya Nasir as Narmeen
 Dr. Sarah Nadeem as Nayyara, Mehru's friend and confidant
 Angeline Malik as Naheed, Maahir's mother
 Shabbir Jan as Jahangir, Maahir's father
 Fareeda Shabbir as Adeela, Jahangir's second wife
 Amber Khan as Ghazal, Sehar's mother
 Raja Haider as Mubarak, Sehar's father
 Salma Asim as Narmeen's mother
 Mojiz Hasan as Babar
 Nauman Ijaz as Hidayatullah (only in flashbacks)
 Aurangzeb Leghari as Mehru's father (only in flashbacks)
 Sakina Samo as Durdana, Hidayatullah's sister
 Javed Sheikh as Ibtisam, Durdana's brother-in-law
 Hira Umer as Nadia, Zameer's ex-girlfriend

Production 
The project was first announced on 8 July 2021. Osman Khalid Butt was first approached to portray the leading role of Mahir, however due to his other commitments he could not do it. Later Bilal Abbas Khan was cast in the role. With Khan, singer-turned-actress Hadiqa Kiani was selected to portray the other leading role. It marked her second series after her debut in poetic-romamce Raqeeb Se. She revealed in an interview that Mehru [Dobara] is her attempt to break some norms as an actor regarding age.

Reception

Television rating 
It led the rating charts for its 6th episode with 6.2 trps. It again led the slot in 11th episode by achieving 6.5 trps. The 13th episode of the serial received ratings of 7.2 TRPs. 15th episode received 6.7 TRPs. The 16th episode saw a boost and it led the slot with 7.6 TRPs. The 17th episode saw another boost and the serial achieved the whopping 8.8 TRPs. 25th episode received 6.1 TRPs. In the month of Ramadan, Dobara was continuously leading its slot with 5-6 TRPs and became No 1 drama of the week. After Ramadan, it received tough competition from rivals but still managed to receive decent ratings of 4-5 TRPs and ended on 6.5.

Critcial reception 
Critically, the series received acclaim and praise for storyline and performances especially for the performance of the lead cast. DAWN Images lauded its diversified and plot and strong narrative against the societal stereotypes. Maliha Rehman of Dawn gave mixed review to its narrative stating, "Most of the time, Dobara is narrated with great sensitivity and attention to detail."

With the introduction of false allegations of sexual harassment, social media users criticised the script. Due to weak characterization of the male lead, the series' conclusion received mixed reviews from social media users.

References

External links
 

Hum TV original programming
2021 Pakistani television series debuts
Pakistani drama television series
Urdu-language television shows
2020s Pakistani television series
Pakistani romantic drama television series
Television series by MD Productions
MD Productions